St. Michael's Cemetery is a Roman Catholic cemetery in Toronto, Ontario, Canada. It is located just southwest of Yonge Street and St. Clair Avenue. The  cemetery is invisible from the street, being located in the middle of a city block and ringed by homes and stores. It is accessible only through a small alleyway between two stores on Yonge Street. The gates to the cemetery are also usually kept locked.

History
The city's oldest surviving Catholic cemetery, it opened in 1855. It replaced St. Paul's Cemetery at Queen and Parliament, which had been filled to capacity by the recent influx of Irish Catholic settlers. Some 29,000 people are buried at St. Michael's. It is the final resting place mostly for working-class Irish Canadians. St. Michael's remained the only Catholic cemetery in Toronto until 1900 when it was near capacity, and the Mount Hope Cemetery was opened.   

One of the most notable features of the cemetery is the octagonal mortuary vault designed by Joseph Sheard, who later became mayor of Toronto.

Notable interments
Some notable figures are interred there including brewer Eugene O'Keefe and Victoria Cross recipient Denis Dempsey.

The cemetery contains the graves of seven Canadian servicemen of World War I, which are registered by the Commonwealth War Graves Commission.

References

Baglole, Joel. "Neighbours distraught after cemetery damaged." Toronto Star. Toronto, Ont.: Jul 10, 1998. pg. 1
Hurst, Lynda. "History speaks from the grave." Toronto Star. Toronto, Ont.: May 29, 1998. pg. 1
Archdiocese of Toronto - The History of St. Michael's Cemetery

Cemeteries in Toronto
Roman Catholic cemeteries in Canada
1885 establishments in Ontario